Edinburg High School may refer to one of the following:

Edinburg High School (Illinois)
Edinburg High School (North Dakota)
Edinburg High School (Texas)